Marcel Parent (born April 6, 1932) is a retired politician in Montreal, Quebec, Canada. He was chair of the Montreal Catholic School Commission (MCSC) from 1983 to 1984, a Liberal member of the National Assembly of Quebec from 1984 to 1998, and a member of the Montreal city council from 2001 to 2009.

Early life and career
Parent was born in Montreal and attended Collège Notre-Dame du Sacré-Cœur. He earned a bachelor's degree in physical education and recreation from the Université de Montréal (1954), was a lecturer at the same institution from 1963 to 1965, worked in Montreal's parks department, and was assistant director of the city's sports and recreation department from 1980 to 1984. He held a number of positions and responsibilities in the fields of sports and leisure, including serving as Montreal's project officer for the World Youth Games in Denmark in 1967.

School trustee
Parent was secretary and vice-chair of the Montreal Catholic School Commission's Regional Advisory Committee of Parents from 1970 to 1972. He sought election to the commission in the first direct elections for commissioners in 1973 with the combined endorsement of Mouvement scolaire confessionnel and Les parents solidaires, but was defeated. In 1980, he was elected without opposition as a Mouvement scolaire confessionnel candidate in the commission's sixteenth district. He was subsequently appointed to the MCSC's executive and was re-elected in 1983. He served as president from 1983 to 1984, in what appears to have been a contentious time for the board; one source has described his presidency as "raucous."

Member of the National Assembly
Parent was elected to the National Assembly of Quebec in a 1984 by-election in the Montreal division of Sauvé, winning a landslide victory in what had previously been a Parti Québécois (PQ) seat. The PQ were in government during this time, and Parent served for the next year in opposition. He was re-elected in the 1985 provincial election, in which the Liberals won a majority government under Robert Bourassa's leadership, and served as a government backbencher. He was appointed as chair of the province's education committee on February 11, 1986, and held the position until August 9, 1989.

Parent was elected to a second full term in the 1989 provincial election, in which the Liberals were returned to office with a second consecutive majority. He was appointed as chair of the Liberal Party caucus on November 19, 1989. Quebec's political life was dominated in this period by the proposed Meech Lake Accord on reforming the Canadian Constitution. The accord, if approved, would have formally recognized Quebec as a distinct society within Canada. In April 1990, Parent was appointed to a thirteen-member Liberal Party committee led by Jean Allaire to explore options for Quebec, including sovereignty, if the accord failed. Parent was quoted at this time as saying, "if Meech is not adopted nobody can say what will happen."

The accord was eventually rejected, leading to a strong upsurge in support for the Quebec sovereigntist movement. Although himself a Canadian federalist, Parent acknowledged that the sovereignty issue had become a matter of "pride and respect" for many in Quebec. In 1992, he helped ensure the Quebec Liberal Party's support of the Charlottetown Accord, another ultimately unsuccessful attempt at constitutional reform. Parent stood down as caucus chair on January 11, 1994, the same day that Bourassa resigned as premier, and served as chair of the provincial committee on institutions from January 26 to July 24, 1994.

In February 1992, Parent accompanied Quebec's education minister Michel Pagé on a trip to Israel to study how the country integrated new immigrants and encouraged the use of the Hebrew language.

Parent was re-elected again in the 1994 provincial election, in which the Parti Québécois won a majority government and the Liberals moved into opposition. He was appointed as his party's critic on senior's issues. He did not seek re-election in 1998 and instead gave his support to Line Beauchamp, his successor as the Liberal Party's candidate in the riding.

During the 1997 Canadian federal election, Parent served as a campaign co-chair for Liberal Party of Canada candidate Denis Coderre in the Bourassa riding.

City councillor
Parent returned to political life in the 2001 Montreal municipal election, winning election as a candidate of Gérald Tremblay's Montreal Island Citizens Union (MICU) in the three-member division of Montréal-Nord. Tremblay was elected as mayor and MICU won a majority of seats on council; Parent was selected as chair (i.e., speaker) of council when it first met in early 2002 and also led a municipal committee on democracy and transparency in the city. Relations between municipal parties were extremely fraught after the 2001 election, and in late May 2002 Parent walked out of the chair's position in frustration at council's inability to move forward with its agenda. He returned to the position the following month. Parent also served as chair of the Montréal-Nord borough council after the 2001 election; in 2003, this position was restyled as borough mayor.

Parent was directly re-elected as Montréal-Nord's borough mayor in the 2005 municipal election and, by virtue of holding this position, automatically continued to serve on city council. Tremblay was re-elected as mayor of the city, MICU again won a majority on council, and Parent was again chosen as city council speaker. In 2006, he credited Montreal's 2002 amalgamation with giving Montréal-Nord an extra five million dollars in its budget.

Parent faced calls for his resignation following the shooting death of Fredy Villanueva by a Montreal Police officer in Montréal-Nord in August 2008. Some members of community organizations argued that Parent was "out of touch" and unaware of racial profiling in the community. He did not resign at the time, but he retired from politics the following year at age seventy-seven rather than seeking re-election in the 2009 municipal election.

Electoral record

Municipal

Provincial

School board

References

1932 births
Living people
Quebec Liberal Party MNAs
Montreal city councillors
People from Montréal-Nord
Quebec school board members
21st-century Canadian politicians